Chalioides vitrea is a moth of the family Psychidae first described by Swinhoe in 1892. It is found in Oriental regions of India and Sri Lanka.

Larval host plants are Camellia sinensis, Eucalyptus camaldulensis, Grewia hirsuta, Mangifera indica, Quisqualis indica, Tamarindus indica, Albizia and Acacia.

References

External links
Host-Parasite list

Moths of Asia
Moths described in 1892
Psychidae